The 1909 Mercer Baptists football team was an American football team that represented Mercer University as a member of the Southern Intercollegiate Athletic Association (SIAA) during the 1909 college football season. In their second year under head coach Frank Blake, the team compiled an 3–5 record, with a mark of 0–4 in the SIAA.

Schedule

References

Mercer
Mercer Bears football seasons
Mercer Baptists football